The Roman Catholic Diocese of La Dorada–Guaduas is a diocese located in the cities of La Dorada and Guaduas in the Ecclesiastical province of Manizales in Colombia.

History
29 March 1984: Established as Diocese of La Dorada – Guaduas from the Diocese of Barrancabermeja, Diocese of Facatativá and Metropolitan Archdiocese of Manizales

Cathedral

Bishops

Ordinaries
Fabio Betancur Tirado (1984.03.29 – 1996.10.15), appointed Archbishop of Manizales
Oscar Aníbal Salazar Gómez (1999.06.05 – 2019.01.13)
Hency Martínez Vargas (2019.01.13 - present)

Other priests of this diocese who became bishops
Nelson Jair Cardona Ramírez, appointed Bishop of San José del Guaviare in 2016
Ovidio Giraldo Velásquez, appointed Bishop of Barrancabermeja in 2020

See also
Roman Catholicism in Colombia

Sources

External links
 Catholic Hierarchy
 GCatholic.org

Roman Catholic dioceses in Colombia
Roman Catholic Ecclesiastical Province of Manizales
Christian organizations established in 1984
Roman Catholic dioceses and prelatures established in the 20th century
1984 establishments in Colombia